Lix da Cunha (April 9, 1896 in Mogi-Mirim – August 6, 1984 in Campinas) was an engineer and architect. In 1924, he founded a homonymous construction company located in Campinas, Brazil. The SP-73 highway is named after him.

External links
 Lix da Cunha S.A. 

Construction and civil engineering companies of Brazil
Companies listed on B3 (stock exchange)
Companies based in Campinas
Construction and civil engineering companies established in 1924
1924 establishments in Brazil